Nidhamu is a recording by the jazz musician Sun Ra and his Astro-Intergalactic-Infinity Arkestra, documenting their first visit to Egypt.

Tracks 1-3 were recorded live at the Ballon Theatre in Cairo on December 17, 1971; track 4 is a solo keyboard performance recorded a week previously.

Track listing
"Space Loneliness #2"
"Discipline #11" 
"Discipline #15" 
"Nidhamu"

Personnel
John Gilmore - tenor saxophone
Danny Davis - alto saxophone, flute
Marshall Allen - alto saxophone, flute, oboe
Kwame Hadi - trumpet, conga drums
Pat Patrick - baritone saxophone
Elo Omoe - bass clarinet
Tommy Hunter - percussion
Danny Ray Thompson - baritone saxophone, flute
June Tyson - vocal
Larry Narthington - alto saxophone, conga drum
Lex Humphries - percussion
Hakim Rahim - alto saxophone, flute
Sun Ra - organ, rocksichord, piano
Tam Fiofori - engineer

Sun Ra live albums
1972 live albums
Live free jazz albums
El Saturn Records live albums